The Frisco Silver Dollar Line is a  narrow-gauge heritage railroad and amusement park attraction located in the Silver Dollar City amusement park in Branson, Missouri. The railroad opened on May 27, 1962, making it the oldest operating ride at Silver Dollar City. It is themed after American railways in the 1800s, more recently and specifically off the Frisco. The ride includes an 1800s themed train depot, a water tower, a trestle overpass bridge, a train wreck scene, a staged train robbery, a tunnel, a rectangular shaped roundhouse and an at-grade railroad crossing. It consists of a total of seven steam locomotives, with four of them in operating condition as of 2023. The railroad is 1.52 miles long.

In the middle of the ride, guests experience a show where uneducated train robbers Alphie and Ralphie Bolin try their best to rob the train, but guests are saved just in time by the conductor, who was tricked into searching for "Yankees". During the Old Time Christmas festival at the park, the train is decked-out in lights and becomes the "Frisco Sing-Along Steam Train". The robbery act is replaced by grandpa telling the story of Christmas.

Locomotives

The Frisco Silver Dollar Line consists of a total of seven steam engines, of which four are used as of 2023. All four of them fire on No. 2 diesel fuel as their fuel source. They are 610 mm (2 foot) narrow-gauge steam locomotives. The Frisco Silver Dollar Line also has two sets of four passenger cars, which are always pulled by one of the operating steam engines. There is an “old” and “new” set of passenger cars, with the old ones being built in the 1970s, and the new ones being built from 2011 to 2016.

Frisco’s Involvement
The St. Louis–San Francisco Railway, also commonly known as the “Frisco”, was a standard-gauge railroad which operated in the general area.  It supplied construction help to the park, along with the rails and ties, back when this line was being built in 1962.  Perhaps for these reasons, the trains sport the Frisco name and logo.  However, this was never an actual Frisco rail line and the steam locomotives were never actual rolling stock on the Frisco.

Incidents
On October 26, 2022, at around 6:00 pm, a train led by engine #504 derailed, with three of the four coaches and the locomotive's tender tipping over on their right side. Six guests and one crew member were injured. Following the derailment, the railroad was closed for the remainder of the 2022 season pending an investigation by both Silver Dollar City and Missouri State investigators.

See also

Dollywood Express
Rail transport in Walt Disney Parks and Resorts
Stone Mountain Scenic Railroad

References

External links

Heritage railroads in Missouri
Railroads of amusement parks in the United States
Steam locomotives of the United States